The 1979 Lagos Classic was a men's tennis tournament played on outdoor hard courts at the Lagos Lawn Tennis Club in Lagos, Nigeria. The event was part of the World Championship Tennis tier of the 1979 Grand Prix circuit. It was the third edition of the tournament and was held from 26 February until 4 March 1979. Unseeded Hans Kary won the singles title.

Finals

Singles
 Hans Kary defeated  Peter Feigl, 6–4, 3–6, 6–2
 It was Kary's only singles title of his career.

Doubles
 Bruce Kleege /  Joel Bailey defeated  Ismail El Shafei /  Peter Feigl 6–4, 6–7, 6–3

References

External links
 ITF tournament edition details

Lagos Classic
1979 in Nigerian sport
Tennis tournaments in Nigeria
International sports competitions in Lagos
20th century in Lagos